Behaidohor  is a village in Bangladesh, located in Nij Bahadurpur Union, Barlekha Upazila, Moulvibazar District. The Behaidohor Hafijia Madrasha is a notable educational institution here.

The population of this village is 1,250 and consists mostly of Bengali Muslims of Sylheti descent. The village has a cemetery, the Behaidohor Central Graveyard as well as a school called Behaidohor Government Primary School. The Behaidohor Jagoroni Club is one of the valuable club in the entire union. There is a mosques in the village, called Behaidohor Jame Masjid and one eidgah, Behaidohor-Buali Central Eidgah.

References 

Villages in Maulvibazar District
Barlekha Upazila